George Thomas Moore Marriott (14 September 1885 – 11 December 1949) was an English character actor best remembered for the series of films he made with Will Hay. His first appearance with Hay was in the film Dandy Dick (1935), but he was a significant supporting performer in Hay's films from 1936 to 1940, and while he starred with Hay during this period he played a character called "Harbottle" that was based on a character Marriott usually played. His character Harbottle was originally created by Hay when he used the character in his "The fourth form at St. Michael's" sketches in the 1920s.

Career

Marriott was born at Alpha Place, Yiewsley, Middlesex, on 14 September 1885, the son of George Matthew Marriott (1859–1940), who was then a commercial traveller, and his wife, Edith Rousby, née Coleman (1864–1946). His parents were actors, and his father became a theatrical manager. Moore Marriott made his stage debut at the age of five. He had originally intended to train as an architect, but instead he became an actor in films. Rather like Clive Dunn and Wilfrid Brambell later, he became typecast as playing old men when he was still relatively young. He had a special set of artificial teeth which he would put in to play his 'old man' characters. He had no teeth in real life and took four different sets of false teeth with him to achieve variety in his characters.

Although he made 131 film appearances from 1912, today he is probably best known as old "Harbottle" in a number of comedy films he made with Will Hay and Graham Moffatt, including Oh, Mr Porter! (1937) and Ask a Policeman (1939), as well as Jerry the Mole in Convict 99 (1938), again with Hay and Moffatt. During the filming of Hay's film Dandy Dick (1935), Marriott played an uncredited stableboy. During the filming of Dandy Dick, Marriott said to Hay he thought he should be a straight man to him in his old-man character. His first role as a straight man using this character was in Hay's film Windbag the Sailor (1936) along with Graham Moffatt.

Following the dissolution of the Will Hay/Graham Moffatt/Moore Marriott partnership, he continued to play his Harbottle-type character in films with the comedian Arthur Askey and the Crazy Gang, e.g. I Thank You (1941) and Back-Room Boy (1942). His other film appearances included Millions Like Us (1943) and Green for Danger (1946).

Death
In his later years, Marriott kept a grocer's store in Bognor Regis, and it is where he died on 11 December 1949; only eight months after the death of his comedy partner, Will Hay. Cause of death was cardiac syncope, acute pulmonary oedema and chronic myocardiac degeneration caused by earlier pneumonia. He outlived his mother and his father by merely 3 years and 9 years respectively. He was cremated at Golders Green Crematorium, where his ashes were also interred.

Legacy 
The Will Hay Appreciation Society was founded in 2009 by British artist Tom Marshall, and aims to preserve the legacy of Will Hay, Moore Marriott and Graham Moffatt and to bring their work to a new generation of fans. As of June 2019, the organisation has over 4200 members. The Will Hay Appreciation Society unveiled a memorial bench to Will Hay, Moore Marriott and Graham Moffatt in October 2018, in Cliddesden, Hampshire the filming location for Oh, Mr. Porter!. The bench was unveiled by Pete Waterman.

Selected filmography

 A Maid of the Alps (1912, Short)
 By the Shortest of Heads (1915, Short) - Capt. Fields
 Grim Justice (1916) - Grandfather Transom
 The Grip of Iron (1920) - Smiler
 Mary Latimer, Nun (1920) - Dickey Stubbs
 The Winding Road (1920) - Jed Sterrett
 Three Men in a Van (1921) - Mudley
 The Head of the Family (1922) - Mate
 The Monkey's Paw (1923) - John White
 Lawyer Quince (1924, Short) - Quince
 Dixon's Return (1924, Short) - Bob Dixon
 The Conspirators (1924) - Morris / Sydney Barnes
 The Mating of Marcus (1924) - Reverend Cheffins
 Ordeal by Golf (1924, Short) - Reverend Heeza Jones
 Not for Sale (1924) - Solicitor
 Afraid of Love (1925) - Father
 Confessions (1925) - Hardy
 King of the Castle (1925) - Peter Coffin
 The Gold Cure (1925) - Janbois
 Every Mother's Son (1926) - Nobby
 The Qualified Adventurer (1926) - Bosun
 London Love (1926) - Aaron Levinsky
 Passion Island (1927) - Beppo
 Second to None (1927) - Bill Hyde
 The Silver Lining (1927) - Gypsy
 Carry On (1927) - Mick Trevorn
 Huntingtower (1927) - Speidel
 Victory (1928) - Seth Lee
 Toni (1928) - Meyer
 Sweeney Todd (1928) - Sweeney Todd
 Widecombe Fair (1928) - Uncle Tom Cobleigh
 Kitty (1929) - Workman (uncredited)
 Mr. Smith Wakes Up (1929, Short) - Mr. Smith
 The Lady from the Sea (1929) - Old Roberts
 The Flying Scotsman (1929) - Bob White
 Kissing Cup's Race (1930) - Joe Tricker
 Aroma of the South Seas (1931, Short) - The King
 The Speckled Band (1931) - Member of Jury (uncredited)
 The Lyons Mail (1931) - Choppard
 Dance Pretty Lady (1931) - Mr. Raeburn
 Up for the Cup (1931) - James Hardcastle
 The Crooked Lady (1932) - Crabby
 The Water Gipsies (1932) - Mr. Pewtar
 Nine till Six (1932) - Doorman
 Mr. Bill the Conqueror (1932) - Tom Turtle
 The Sign of Four (1932) - Mordecai Smith (uncredited)
 Heroes of the Mine (1932) - Gaffer
 The Wonderful Story (1932) - Zacky Richards
 Little Waitress (1932) - Baron Halfsburg
 The Crime at Blossoms (1933) - Driver
 Money for Speed (1933) - Shorty
 A Moorland Tragedy (1933, Short) - The Old Man
 Dora (1933, Short) - Thomas Henry Jones
 The House of Trent (1933) - Ferrier
 Lucky Blaze (1933) - Sir James Benson
 Love's Old Sweet Song (1933) - Old Tom
 Hawley's of High Street (1933) - Mr. Busworth
 A Political Party (1934) - Jim Turner
 Faces (1934) - Robert Pelham
 Girls, Please! (1934) - Oldest Inhabitant
 Nell Gwynn (1934) - Robin
 The Scoop (1934) - Jim Stewart
 The Feathered Serpent (1934) - Harry Hugg
 Dandy Dick (1935) - Stableboy (uncredited)
 Drake of England (1935) - Bright
 The Man Without a Face (1935) - Tinker John
 Turn of the Tide (1935) - Tindal Fosdyck
 Gay Old Dog (1935) - George Bliss
 It's a Bet (1935) - Farmer (uncredited)
 When Knights Were Bold (1936) - The Tramp
 Strange Cargo (1936) - Captain Burch
 Wednesday's Luck (1936) - Nobby
 The Amazing Quest of Ernest Bliss (1936) - Edwards (uncredited)
 As You Like It (1936) - Denis (uncredited)
 Luck of the Turf (1936) - Mr. Jackson
 Talk of the Devil (1936) - Dart Thrower (uncredited)
 Accused (1936) - Dubec
 Windbag the Sailor (1936) - Jeremiah Harbottle
 Feather Your Nest (1937) - Mr. Jenkins
 Fifty-Shilling Boxer (1937) - Tim Regan
 The Fatal Hour (1937) - Dixon
 Night Ride (1937) - Miner (scenes deleted)
 Victoria the Great (1937) - Train Driver
 Oh, Mr Porter! (1937) - Jeremiah Harbottle
 Intimate Relations (1937) - Toomley
 Owd Bob (1938) - Samuel
 Held for Ransom (1938) - Hathaway
 Convict 99 (1938) - Jerry, The Mole
 Old Bones of the River (1938) - Jerry Harbottle
 A Girl Must Live (1939) - Bretherton Hythe
 Ask a Policeman (1939) - Harbottle
 Cheer Boys Cheer (1939) - Geordie
 Where's That Fire? (1939) - Jeremiah Harbottle
 The Frozen Limits (1939) - Tom Tiddler
 Band Waggon (1940) - Jasper
 Charley's (Big-Hearted) Aunt (1940) - Jerry
 Gasbags (1941) - Jerry Jenkins
 I Thank You (1941) - 'Pop' Bennett
 Hi Gang! (1941) - Uncle Jerry
 Back-Room Boy (1942) - Jerry
 Millions Like Us (1943) - Jim Crowson
 Time Flies (1944) - A Soothsayer
 It Happened One Sunday (1944) - Hospital Porter
 Don't Take It to Heart (1944) - Granfer
 A Place of One's Own (1945) - George
 I'll Be Your Sweetheart (1945) - George Le Brunn
 The Agitator (1945) - Ben Duckett
 Green for Danger (1946) - The Patients: Joseph Higgins
 The Root of All Evil (1947) - William Scholes
 Green Fingers (1947) - Pickles
 The Hills of Donegal (1947) - Old Jake
 The History of Mr. Polly (1949) - Uncle Pentstemon
 High Jinks in Society (1949) - Grandpa (final film role)

References

External links

Moore Marriott at BFI
Moore Marriott at AllMovie

1885 births
1949 deaths
English male film actors
English male silent film actors
People from West Drayton
20th-century English male actors
Golders Green Crematorium
British male comedy actors